Scotland Yard is a series of 39 half-hour episodes produced by Anglo-Amalgamated. Produced between 1953 and 1961, they are short films, originally made to support the main feature in a cinema double-bill. Each film focuses on a true crime case with names changed, and feature an introduction by the crime writer Edgar Lustgarten.

The earlier films were produced by Alec C. Snowden, who was succeeded by Jack Greenwood. Directors included Ken Hughes and Montgomery Tully. The principal character in each film is a Detective Inspector, played by a variety of actors but most frequently by Russell Napier (usually portraying DI Duggan). Many of the films feature, in supporting roles, actors later to become well-known. They include Jill Bennett, Peter Arne, Harry H. Corbett, James Villiers, Arthur Lowe, Peter Halliday, Wilfrid Brambell, Rita Webb, Peter Bowles and Roger Delgado.

All of the episodes were shot at Merton Park Studios in London and on location on monochrome 35mm film. Most of the episodes were presented in the old Academy screen ratio of 1.33:1, whilst a handful of the later episodes were shot in a hard-matted widescreen ratio of 1.66:1.

The series later found a new audience on television in both the UK and the USA. The complete series has been released on DVD in the UK by Network. From 2017 it has been shown on the UK TV channel Talking Pictures TV.

Episode list

Here is the list of Scotland Yard episodes (with their 25fps running times):

 ‘The Drayton Case’ (24:47) 
 ‘The Missing Man’ (29:31) 
 ‘The Candlelight Murder’ (31:24) 
 ‘The Blazing Caravan’ (1954) (31:46) 
 ‘The Dark Stairway’ (31:32) 
 ‘Late Night Final’ (28:31) 
 ‘Fatal Journey’ (30:08) 
 ‘The Strange Case of Blondie’ (31:52) 
 ‘The Silent Witness’ (31:50) 
 ‘Passenger to Tokyo’ (31:14) 
 ‘Night Plane to Amsterdam’ (30:34) 
 ‘The Stateless Man’ (28:36) 
 ‘The Mysterious Bullet’ (31:09) 
 ‘Murder Anonymous’ (31:58) 
 ‘The Wall of Death’ (30:22) 
 ‘The Case of the River Morgue’ (32:16) 
 ‘Destination Death’ (31:41) 
 ‘Person Unknown’ (31:47) 
 ‘The Lonely House’ (32:14) 
 ‘Bullet from the Past’ (31:46) 
 ‘Inside Information’ (30:40) 
 ‘The Case of the Smiling Widow’ (31:33) 
 ‘The Mail Van Murder’ (29:10) 
 ‘The Tyburn Case’ (32:24) 
 ‘The White Cliffs Mystery’ (32:20) 
 ‘Night Crossing’ (31:50) 
 ‘Print of Death’ (26:46) 
 ‘Crime of Honour’ (26:46) 
 ‘The Cross-Road Gallows’ (28:17) 
 ‘The Unseeing Eye’ (27:39) 
 ‘The Ghost Train Murder’ (31:19) 
 ‘The Dover Road Mystery’ (29:05) 
 ‘The Last Train’ (31:52) 
 ‘Evidence in Concrete’ (28:03) 
 ‘The Silent Weapon’ (27:18) 
 ‘The Grand Junction Case’ (26:48) 
 ‘The Never Never Murder’ (29:46) 
 ‘Wings of Death’ (27:41) 
 ‘The Square Mile Murder’ (27:39)

Guest appearances
The real-life ballistics expert Robert Churchill appears in The Mysterious Bullet, and the barrister Travers Humphreys in Murder Anonymous.

Journalist and broadcaster Ludovic Kennedy plays a newsreader in  The Lonely House. At this time, he was a newsreader for Independent Television News, but himself went on to investigate real-life crimes such as the Lindbergh kidnapping and the Derek Bentley case. Kennedy's re-examination of the murder conviction of Timothy Evans in his 1961 book Ten Rillington Place was particularly noteworthy in the movement to abolish the death penalty in the United Kingdom.

USA TV scheduling
Scotland Yard aired at 10 p.m Eastern on ABC opposite The $64,000 Challenge on CBS and The Loretta Young Show on NBC. It was replaced on the 1958 autumn schedule by the five-week series Encounter, a drama anthology which originated from Toronto, Ontario, Canada.

The BBC television series of the same name broadcast in 1960, and the 1970s London Weekend Television series New Scotland Yard are unrelated to these films.

See also
 The Scales of Justice
 The Edgar Wallace Mysteries
 The Human Jungle (TV series)

References

1953 American television series debuts
1961 American television series endings
Black-and-white American television shows
English-language television shows
American Broadcasting Company original programming
Television shows set in London